Cyangugu Province was one of the 12 former provinces of Rwanda. In 2006, it became part of the Western Province. It bordered Bukavu, a town located in East of the Democratic Republic of Congo.

Former provinces of Rwanda
States and territories disestablished in 2006